Aghbolagh-e Hashtrud (also Romanized as Āghbolāgh-e Hashtrūd; also known as Āq Bolāgh and Āqbolāgh-e Hashtrūd) is a village in Nazarkahrizi Rural District, Nazarkahrizi District, Hashtrud County, East Azerbaijan Province, Iran. At the 2006 census, its population was 118, in 27 families.

References 

Towns and villages in Hashtrud County